Apophyllite-(KF) or fluorapophyllite is a mineral of the apophyllite group, with the chemical formula of KCa4Si8O20(F,OH)·8(H2O). It gets the first half of its name, "fluor", from containing more fluorine than hydroxide compared to the other minerals in the apophyllite group. 
 
Fluorapophyllite crystallizes in the tetragonal crystal system. Tetragonal minerals have three axes of different lengths and angles of 90 degrees. Fluorapophyllite is an anisotropic mineral and has low relief. This mineral belongs to the uniaxial (+) optical class, which means its indicatrix has a prolate sphenoid shape with a circular section, principal section, and one optic axis.

Among the apophyllite group, fluorapophyllite is the most abundant compared to the other two minerals in the group, hydroxyapophyllite and natroapophyllite. It is popular among many mineral collectors because of the large, well-developed crystals they form and the multiple colors they come in. The most wanted variation of fluorapophyllite is the green colored variant, which is found in India. Fluorapophyllite is also found in New Jersey of the United States. This mineral is found as a secondary mineral in vesicles in volcanic rocks such as basalt.

Images

References

Phyllosilicates
Tetragonal minerals
Minerals in space group 128